Paraopeba is a Brazilian municipality located in the northeast of the state of Minas Gerais. The city belongs to the meso-region of Metropolitana de Belo Horizonte and to the micro-region of Sete Lagoas. It became a municipality in 1911.

Location
Neighboring  municipalities are:  Curvelo (N),  Cordisburgo (NE), Araçaí, (E), Sete Lagoas (SE), Caetanópolis and Inhaúma (S), Papagaios (W).

Distances
Belo Horizonte: 100 km south on BR-040
Sete Lagoas: 26 km south on BR-040 
Cordisburgo: 24 km northeast on MG-231

Economic activities
Services, agriculture, and small industries are the main economic activities.  The GDP in 2005 was approximately R$172 million, with 18 million reais from taxes, 98 million reais from services, 35 million reais from industry, and 20 million reais from agriculture.  There were 518 rural producers on 150,000 hectares of land (2006).  Approximately 2,200 persons were occupied in agriculture.  The main crops are citrus fruits, sugarcane, rice, beans, and corn.  There were 32,000 head of cattle, of which 8,000 were milk cows (2006).  Only 108 of the rural properties had tractors in 2006.

Of the working force there were 1,316 workers in 113 small industries, 1,166 workers in 434 retail units, and 628 workers in public administration (2006).

There were 2 banks (2007). In the vehicle fleet there were 2,807 automobiles, 362 trucks, 359 pickup trucks, 42 buses, and 929 motorcycles (2007).

Health and education
In the health sector there were 10 health establishments, which included 5 public health clinics, and 4 private clinics (2005).  There was 1 private hospital with 29 beds.  Educational needs of 5,600 students were met by 13 primary schools, 3 middle schools, and 7 pre-primary schools.

Municipal Human Development Index: 0.767 (2000)
State ranking: 184 out of 853 municipalities as of 2000
National ranking: 1,410 out of 5,138 municipalities as of 2000 
Literacy rate: 90%
Life expectancy: 70 (average of males and females)

In 2000 the per capita monthly income of R$216.00 was below the state average of R$276.00 and below the national average of R$297.00.  Poços de Caldas had the highest per capita monthly income in 2000 with R$435.00.  The lowest was Setubinha with R$73.00.

The highest ranking municipality in Minas Gerais in 2000 was Poços de Caldas with 0.841, while the lowest was Setubinha with 0.568.  Nationally the highest was São Caetano do Sul in São Paulo with 0.919, while the lowest was Setubinha.  In more recent statistics (considering 5,507 municipalities) Manari in the state of Pernambuco has the lowest rating in the country—0,467—putting it in last place.

References

See also
 List of municipalities in Minas Gerais

Municipalities in Minas Gerais